Yashima Station is the name of two train stations in Japan:

 Yashima Station (Kagawa) (屋島駅)
 Yashima Station (Akita) (矢島駅)